Xiangshan or Siangshan District is a district in southwest Hsinchu City, Taiwan. It is the largest of the three districts in Hsinchu City.

History
Xiangshan was originally a township of Hsinchu County. On 1 July 1982, the area was incorporated into the newly-formed Hsinchu City as a district.

Geography
 Area: 
 Population: 78,775 (February 2023)

Administrative divisions
The district consists of Gangnan, Hushan, Hulin, Jinshui, Shuxia, Puqian, Zhongpu, Niupu, Dingpu, Tungxiang, Xiangcun, Xiangshan, Dazhuang, Meishan, Zhaoshan, Haishan, Jiadong, Dahu, Nanai, Zhongai, Neihu, Yanshui, Nangang and Dingfu Villages.

Economy
It is most well known locally for the Hsiangshan Industrial Park and for having the major portion of Hsinchu City's " Scenic Coastline" boardwalk.

Education

Universities
 Chung Hua University
 Hsuan Chuang University
 Yuanpei University of Medical Technology

Schools
 Hsinchu International School

Tourist attractions
 Haishan Fishing Port
 Hsiangshan Wetland Natural Park
 Jincheng Lake Bird Watching Zone
 Seafront Scenic Area at Kangnan

Transportation

 TRA Xiangshan Station
 Local buses connect Xiangshan district to other parts of Hsinchu city, Inter-city buses also provide transport to Taipei, Taichung and Banqiao.

Notable natives
 Lin Chih-chien, Mayor of Hsinchu City

References

External links

  

Districts of Hsinchu